Sigbritt Karlsson is a chemical engineer. She has been the president of KTH Royal Institute of Technology since November 2016.

Karlsson earned a master of science in chemical engineering with a specialization in biotechnology from KTH.  She subsequently completed a PhD in polymer technology.

From 1996 to 2004 Karlsson worked as Director of Studies at KTH.  Between 2008 and 2010 she was Vice Dean with responsibility for strategic education issues.

Karlsson was Vice-Chancellor of the University of Skövde 2010–2016. On November 12, 2016, she became the 19th President of KTH Royal Institute of Technology.

References 

Living people
Year of birth missing (living people)
Swedish chemical engineers
Women chemical engineers
21st-century Swedish engineers
21st-century chemists
21st-century women engineers
Women heads of universities and colleges
Rectors of KTH Royal Institute of Technology